Itha Oru Snehagatha is a 1997 Indian Malayalam romance film, written and directed by Captain Raju. The film stars Vikram,  and Laila in the leading roles. It was dubbed and released in Tamil as Thrill in May 2002, shortly after the success of Dhill, in which Vikram and Laila had featured.

Plot 
Church Father Daniel is appointed as the junior priest of the town church and subsequently tries to unite the warring population of Hindus and Christians in the town. The Christians are led by Kariyachan and Mathayichan, while the Hindus from the town are led by Raman Nair. Father Daniel forms a music troupe called "Rhythm Orchestra"  along with the cross-religion lovers Roy and Hema, trying to unite them. Meanwhile, Father Daniel faces stiff opposition from various quarters.

Cast

Release 
In 2002, following the success of the Vikram-Laila starrer Dhill (2001), Golden Cine Creations chose to dub the film into Tamil and release it to make the most of Vikram's rising popularity. When enquired about his opinion on his old films being dubbed and re-released, Vikram revealed that he had no problem as such films had given him work during the struggling phase of his career. A song with lyrics featuring the titles of Vikram's other films was prepared for the Tamil version.

Soundtrack 

The soundtrack album is composed by Johnson. Lyrics were penned by Kaithapram. The songs are sung by
K. S. Chitra, Biju Narayanan, Sindhu, K. J. Yesudas and Sangeetha Sajith.

Tamil version had new set of songs composed by Deva.

References

External links 

1997 films
Indian romance films
Films scored by Deva (composer)
1990s romance films
1990s Malayalam-language films